The men's high jump at the 1962 British Empire and Commonwealth Games as part of the athletics programme was held at the Perry Lakes Stadium on Saturday 24 November 1962.

Hobson won by one inch ahead of fellow countryman Chilla Porter and Anton Norris from Barbados who won the bronze medal.

Records

Final

References

Men's high jump
1962